Raini may refer to:

 Raini Rodriguez (born 1993), an American actress and singer
 Lorraine (given name)
 Loraine (name)
 Taranagar, a city and a municipality in India
 Raini, Chamoli, a village in India, effected by the 2021 Uttarakhand flood

See also 
 Rainis, the pseudonym of Jānis Pliekšāns (1865–1929), a Latvian poet, playwright, translator, and politician
 Rainie (disambiguation)
 Reni (disambiguation)
 Rini (disambiguation)